Barbara Grace Pont (born 20 December 1933) is an English former cricketer who played as a right-handed batter and right-arm medium bowler. She appeared in two Test matches for England in 1960 and 1961, both against South Africa. She played domestic cricket for Sussex.

References

External links
 
 

1933 births
Living people
England women Test cricketers
Sportspeople from Hastings
Sussex women cricketers